Annagh Hill (An tEannach) meaning marsh or bog in Gaelic. Located in the north of county Wexford.

Geography 

Annagh Hill is separated from Croghan Mountain to the north by the "Wicklow Gap", not to be confused with the Wicklow Gap in County Wicklow. Except for the southeastern face (see photo) it is covered in coniferous forestry. 

It overlooks the villages of Monaseed and Hollyfort to the south, across the valley of the Blackwater stream

References

See also 
 River Bann (Wexford)

Mountains and hills of County Wexford
Marilyns of Ireland